Khatra is a Hindi horror fantasy film of Bollywood directed by H.N. Singh and produced by P. Ram Mohan. This movie was released on 10 May 1991 under the banner of Siri Venkata Films. The story line of the movie is loosely based on the plot of Frankenstein, a novel of Mary Shelley. This was the debut film of music composer Aadesh Shrivastava.

Plot
This is a story of a scientist who tried to defeat death, researching with organs of the human body. One day he manages to steal a corpse from a cemetery and conduct his experiment on it. Unfortunately it is going against nature and the dead man revives as a monster. He has acid instead of blood in his body. The monster murders the scientist in a fire and starts to kill women repeatedly.

Cast
 Raza Murad
 Goga Kapoor
 Sumeet Saigal
 Rajesh Vivek
 Ekta Sohini
 Huma Khan
 Manik Irani
 Rakesh Mehta

Music
" Bambai Ke Mausam Mein Pyar Kiye Ja" - Kavita Krishnamurthy
"Main Hoon Kunwari Kali" - Kavita Krishnamurthy
"Main To Ladki Thi Akeli" - Alka Yagnik
"Mohabbhat Ki Ada Kya Hoti Hai" - Anuradha Paudwal

References

External links
 

1991 films
1991 horror films
Films based on adaptations
Frankenstein films
Films scored by Aadesh Shrivastava
1990s Hindi-language films
Indian horror films
Hindi-language horror films